Nayef Zakariya Steitieh (born 1965) is the Jordanian Minister of Labour. He was appointed as minister on 11 October 2021.

References 

1965 births
Living people
21st-century Jordanian politicians
Government ministers of Jordan
Labor ministers of Jordan